Mitchell R. Talbot (born October 17, 1983) is an American former professional baseball pitcher. He has played in Major League Baseball (MLB) for the Tampa Bay Rays and Cleveland Indians and in KBO League for the Samsung Lions and Hanwha Eagles and in the CPBL for the Lamigo Monkeys.

College
The youngest of six siblings, Talbot graduated from Canyon View High School in Cedar City, Utah and was a member of the Salt Lake Tribune's All-State second team during his senior season.

Baseball career

Houston Astros
Talbot was drafted by the Houston Astros in the second round (70th overall) in the 2002 Major League Baseball draft out of high school. He did not sign immediately and as a result did not begin his professional career until .

In , Talbot was rated to have the best changeup in the Astros' organization by Baseball America. He pitched for Single-A Salem and went 8-11 with a 4.34 ERA. Talbot was the Carolina League Pitcher of the Week for the week of July 25 to July 31.

Tampa Bay Devil Rays
On July 12, during the All-Star break, Talbot, along with shortstop Ben Zobrist were traded to the Tampa Bay Devil Rays for outfielder Aubrey Huff. Pitching for two Double-A teams (Corpus Christi and Montgomery), he went a combined 10-7 with a 2.76 ERA. Talbot earned the Devil Rays Minor League pitcher of August after he went 2-1 with a 1.96 ERA and led all of Double-A baseball with 47 strikeouts. He was a member of the Montgomery Biscuits during their 2006 league championship season and was named minorleaguebasell.com's best Double-A playoff performer.

In , Talbot began the year for the Devil Rays' Triple-A team, the Durham Bulls. Talbot was called up to the majors on July 1, . Talbot made his Major League debut on September 15, in relief of Scott Kazmir, and pitched 3.0 innings, giving up 4 earned runs and striking out two batters while walking three against the Boston Red Sox. Talbot made his first Major League start against the Baltimore Orioles on September 23, 2008 during the second game of a double header and did not figure in the decision. He allowed three earned runs on six hits while walking three and striking out two over 4 innings.

Cleveland Indians
On December 21, 2009, he was traded to the Cleveland Indians as a player to be named later in the Kelly Shoppach trade.

Talbot was designated for assignment on July 31, 2011, to make room on the 40-man roster for Ubaldo Jiménez. He accepted his assignment and was sent to the Triple-A Columbus Clippers on August 5, 2011.

Talbot was placed on the Indians' roster again on September 24, 2011. He was outrighted to Triple-A Columbus again on October 18. He elected free agency on October 20.

Samsung Lions
On December 1, 2011, Talbot signed with the Samsung Lions in South Korea.

Miami Marlins
After spending part of the 2013 season with the Marlins he was released during a rehab assignment.

New York Mets
On August 20, 2013, Talbot signed a minor league contract with the New York Mets organization and was assigned to the Triple-A Las Vegas 51s.

Lamigo Monkeys
After spending part of the season with the Long Island Ducks, on August 25, 2014, he signed with the Lamigo Monkeys in Taiwan.

Hanwa Eagles
On December 5, 2014, Talbot signed with the Hanwa Eagles in South Korea of the Korea Baseball Organization for the 2015 season.

Rieleros de Aguascalientes
On April 8, 2016, Talbot signed with the Rieleros de Aguascalientes of the Mexican Baseball League.

Lamigo Monkeys
On June 10, 2016, Talbot announced that he would return to Lamigo Monkeys.

Sugar Land Skeeters
On May 20, 2017, Talbot signed with the Sugar Land Skeeters of the Atlantic League of Professional Baseball.  He re-signed with the team in early 2018.

Second stint with Cleveland Indians
On May 23, 2018, Talbot's contract was purchased by the Cleveland Indians. He elected free agency on November 2, 2018.

Second stint with Sugar Land Skeeters
On March 6, 2019, Talbot signed with the Sugar Land Skeeters of the Atlantic League of Professional Baseball.

Third stint with Cleveland Indians
On June 5, 2019, Talbot's contract was purchased from the Skeeters by the Cleveland Indians. He was assigned to the Columbus Clippers, the Indians' Triple-A affiliate. Talbot elected free agency on November 4, 2019.

References

External links

Career statistics and player information from Korea Baseball Organization

1983 births
American expatriate baseball players in South Korea
American expatriate baseball players in Taiwan
Baseball players from Utah
Charlotte Stone Crabs players
Cleveland Indians players
Columbus Clippers players
Corpus Christi Hooks players
Durham Bulls players
Estrellas Orientales players
American expatriate baseball players in the Dominican Republic
Gigantes del Cibao players
Gulf Coast Marlins players
Gulf Coast Rays players
Hanwha Eagles players
KBO League pitchers
Lamigo Monkeys players
Las Vegas 51s players
Lexington Legends players
Living people
Long Island Ducks players
Mahoning Valley Scrappers players
Major League Baseball pitchers
Martinsville Astros players
Montgomery Biscuits players
New Orleans Zephyrs players
People from Cedar City, Utah
Phoenix Desert Dogs players
Salem Avalanche players
Samsung Lions players
Sugar Land Skeeters players
Tampa Bay Rays players